Imam Khomeini Education and Research Institute (also Imam Khomeini's Educational and Research Institute , Moassesseh-ye Amuzeshi va Pezhuheshi-ye Emam Khomeini) is a Shia Islamic religious educational institute in Qom, Iran.  It was founded in 1991 by cleric Ayatollah Mohammad-Taqi Mesbah-Yazdi who was the institute's director until his passing.

The institute has been described by one source as being concerned with how Iran's Islamic government can adapt the fast-moving scientific and technological developments of the 21st century to its own needs, particularly by explaining scientific issues to leading Islamic religious scholars (marjas) and through these religious scholars bring the thinking of science to the masses of Muslims "so that Iranian scientists can operate on a par with other researchers anywhere in the world."

Another source describes the institute as having been founded to counteract the challenge to and criticism of the clerical leadership of the Islamic government by intellectuals such as Abdolkarim Soroush.

Some clergy at the institute reject the theory of evolution, but approve of other pursuits of science, such as sperm and embryo donation, cloning or surrogate motherhood, and Embryonic stem cell research.

In keeping with the principle of separation of the sexes, women do not participate in classes inside the institute.

The institute publishes the weekly periodical, Parto-Sokhan.

Departments
 Department of Contemporary Iranian Thought and History
 Department of Psychology
 Department of Educational Studies
 Department of Political Science
 Department of Philosophy
 Department of Qur’anic Exegesis and Sciences
 Department of Sociology
 Department of Law
 Department of Mysticism
 Department of Islamic Theology and Philosophy of Religion
 Department of Management
 Department of Religious Studies
 Department of Economics
 Department of Ethics
 Department of History

Personalities
Mahmoud Rajabi (Chancellor)
 Nasser Biria(The Vice President for Research)
 Sadeq Mousavi-Nasab(The Vice President for Education)
 Mohammad Ali Shomali (head of the institute's religious department)
 Muhammad Legenhausen American-born convert to Islam.  Since 1992, he has been studying Islam and teaching Western philosophy and Christianity at the Imam Khomeini Education and Research Institute in Iran.

Publisher
The Imam Khomeini Education and Research publishes many books and magazine every year since it founded. The publisher of the institute is a separate department but under control of the institute. The publisher has gotten several appreciation medal while years. The last one is the position of the selected publisher at the 20th Conference of the Year of the Hawzah(2018). 
Site of the Publisher

Published
some of latest published books:
The fundamentals of innate affairs
Encyclopedia of Applied Ethics
Prophet (PBUH) from the point of view of Ahlul-Bayt (as)

Notes

Works cited

External links
 Official Website

Imam Khomeini's Educational and Research Institute